Vincent R. Sombrotto Park  is on National Park Service property at Louisiana Avenue, 1st and C Streets, NW in the Swampoodle neighborhood of Washington, D.C. across from the National Association of Letter Carriers (NALC).  It is named for Vincent Sombrotto President of the NALC from 1979 to 2002.

References

 

Parks in Washington, D.C.
National Mall and Memorial Parks